Kiniski Gardens is a triangle-shaped residential neighbourhood in the Mill Woods area of south east Edmonton, Alberta, Canada.  It is part of the Burnewood area of Mill Woods, and is named for Julia Kiniski, a local reform politician of the 1960s.

Development of Kiniski Gardens began in the 1970s, when roughly 7% of the residences were constructed.  Construction picked up during the 1980s, when another 41% of residences were constructed.  Most of the remaining construction occurred during the 1990s.

The most common type of residence in the neighbourhood is the single-family dwelling, which makes up 95% of all residences.  The remaining residence are a mixture of apartments in low-rise buildings (3%) and duplexes (2%).  The majority or residences in the neighbourhood (89%) are owner-occupied with the remainder (11%) being rented.

There are two schools in the neighbourhood: the Julia Kiniski Elementary School, which is operated by the Edmonton Public School System, and the Saint Kateri Catholic Elementary School, which is operated by the Edmonton Catholic School Board.

The neighbourhood is bounded on the east by 34 Street.  The north west boundary follows a utility corridor that runs between a point at the north east where 34 Street intersects Whitemud Drive to a point at the south west where the utility corridor intersects 40 Avenue.  The neighbourhood is bounded on the south west by a lind connecting the point where the utility corridor intersects 40 avenue and the pont on 34 Street between 34 Avenue and 35A Avenue.

The community is represented by the Burnewood Community League, established in 1981, which maintains a community hall and outdoor rink located at 41 Street and 41 Avenue.

Demographics 

Surrounding neighbourhoods 
Kiniski Gardens is surrounded by several residential neighbourhoods.  Larkspur and Wild Rose are located to the east, Minchau is located to the southwest, and Jackson Heights is located to the northwest.

See also 
 Edmonton Federation of Community Leagues

References 

Neighbourhoods in Edmonton